Scott Glenndale Martin King (born June 25, 1967) is a Canadian former professional ice hockey goaltender. He played in two National Hockey League games for the Detroit Red Wings during the 1990–91 and 1991–92 seasons. The rest of his career, which lasted from 1990 to 1993, was spent in the minor leagues. He was drafted 10th (190th overall) in the 1986 NHL Entry Draft.

Early life 
King was born in Thunder Bay, Ontario. He headed west from his hometown to join the Richmond Sockeyes of the British Columbia Junior Hockey League during his teenage years.

Career

Minor league hockey
A fast reflex goalie with a right-handed catch, King quickly earned the starting job for the Sockeyes and played 40 games that year, winning 23 and with a 5.05 goals against average (GAA). During the 1985–86 season, King played for the Vernon Lakers and posting an even better 17–9–0 record in 29 games with a 4.64 GAA. The Detroit Red Wings decided to draft King 190th overall in the 1986 NHL Entry Draft.

King attended University of Maine after beginning the 1986–87 season with the Abbotsford Falcons. He had four successful years with the Maine Black Bears men's ice hockey team, being named to all-star teams, his last three years there and winning the Hockey East championship game in 1989 against the Boston College Eagles.

NHL
For the 1990–91 season, King had graduated from the University Maine and joined the Detroit Red Wings organization. He started play for the Hampton Roads Admirals of the East Coast Hockey League playing 15 games. His 8–4–1 record allowed him to be quickly called up to the Adirondack Red Wings of the American Hockey League. In 24 games King posted an 8–10–2 record, but showed promise and poise in the crease. When injury struck Red Wings goalie Tim Cheveldae, a slew of promising minors were called up to try and fill the void for the big club. King was called up on January 28, 1991 to back up goaltender Glen Hanlon in a game against the New Jersey Devils. New Jersey scored four goals against Hanlon in the first 15 minutes and he was pulled, putting King into his first NHL game. King gave up two goals on 11 shots but ended up with no record as the Wings lost 2–6. King finished out the year with Adirondack.

During the 1991–92 season, King moved between Adirondack, the ECHL affiliate Toledo Storm, and the main club. King again was put into an NHL game on November 30, 1991,, as he played the last 16 minutes of a game, replacing Cheveldae in a 3–7 loss against the St. Louis Blues. King played 33 games in Adirondack, finishing with a 14–14–3 record and a 3.53 GAA. Young goalie Chris Osgood was picked up by Detroit for the 1992–93 season and was instantly given the start in most of the games. King was relegated to Toledo where he had a productive year. Having a solid goalie veteran on the team, Toledo excelled and King finished with 26–11–7 record and a playoff berth. King ended the playoffs with a 10–3 record and a Riley Cup victory in six games over the Wheeling Thunderbirds.

Career statistics

Regular season and playoffs

Awards and honors

Named to BCJHL Coastal Division First All-Star Team: 1985
Named to ECHL Second All-Star Team: 1993
Riley Cup Champion: (Toledo Storm – 1993)

References

External links
 

1967 births
Living people
Adirondack Red Wings players
Canadian ice hockey goaltenders
Detroit Red Wings draft picks
Detroit Red Wings players
Hampton Roads Admirals players
Ice hockey people from Ontario
Richmond Sockeyes players
Maine Black Bears men's ice hockey players
Sportspeople from Thunder Bay
Toledo Storm players
Vernon Lakers players